The Algerian Civil Defense (in Arabic: الحماية المدنية) is a unit of the Algerian government responsible for firefighting, rescue services, and emergency response.

History 

Following the Algerian Revolution and the exit of the French colonial powers in 1962, the responsibility for management of Algerian firefighters fell to individual municipalities. On April 15, 1964, under the Presidency of Ahmed Ben Bella, the National Civil Protection Service was created to standardize and professionalize the corps of Algerian firefighters and rescue workers. However, the municipal administration and financing of the services were left intact. 

This structure changed in 1976 when the service was replaced by Algerian Civil Defense, nationalizing administration and day-to-day operations.

References

Civil defense
Emergency services in Algeria
Algeria
Organizations established in 1964